The Cannone da 152/45 modello 1911 was an Italian Naval Gun built by the Ansaldo company.  It formed the secondary armament of the two Andrea Doria class dreadnought battleships built during World War I.  A number of guns were also converted to siege artillery and coastal artillery roles and served during both world wars.

Variants
 Coastal artillery - An unknown number of guns were mounted on shielded pedestal mounts as coastal artillery during both world wars.
 Naval artillery - The secondary armament of this class of two ships consisted of sixteen 45-caliber 152-millimeter (6 in) guns, mounted in single casemates along the sides of the hull underneath the main guns. These guns could traverse 60 degrees, depress to −5 degrees and had a maximum elevation of +20 degrees.  The gun mounts had a reputation of being wet in heavy seas and when the ships were modernized these gun positions were removed and the surplus guns were redeployed.
 Siege artillery - This version consisted of mounting surplus barrels on a large box trail carriage to address the Italian Army's need for siege artillery and long-range counter-battery work.  The carriage had a large open section in the middle that allowed the gun to reach high angles of elevation.  In order to deploy the guns a large pit had to be dug to allow the breech to recoil and this also allowed the gun crew to service the gun's breech.  At the front of the pit, there was a platform to anchor the gun which also allowed for limited traverse.  53 were in Italian service in 1939 mostly in Northern Italy.  The German designation for the gun was the 15.2 cm K 411(i).

Photo Gallery

References

 

World War I guns
World War II field artillery
World War I artillery of Italy
World War II artillery of Italy
Naval guns of Italy
152 mm artillery
Gio. Ansaldo & C. artillery
Coastal artillery